Locharbriggs railway station was a station which served Locharbriggs, in the Scottish county of Dumfries and Galloway.

History
Opened by the Dumfries, Lochmaben and Lockerbie Railway, then part of the Caledonian Railway it became part of the London Midland and Scottish Railway during the Grouping of 1923, passing on to the Scottish Region of British Railways during the nationalisation of 1948. It was then closed by British Railways.

References

Notes

Sources
 
 
 
 Station on navigable O.S. map

Disused railway stations in Dumfries and Galloway
Former Caledonian Railway stations
Railway stations in Great Britain opened in 1863
Railway stations in Great Britain closed in 1952